Mikhail Grachev (born 4 January 1988) is a Russian racing driver currently competing in the TCR International Series. He made his debut in 2015, having previously raced in the European Touring Car Cup.

Racing career
Grachev began his career Karting in 2008. In 2011 Grachev made his Russian Touring Car Championship debut in the Touring-Light class, winning the Touring-Light championship in 2012. He raced in the overall championship from 2013 to 2014, winning the championship both years. In 2013 Grachev also raced in the European Touring Car Cup, he raced in the championship from 2013 to 2014. In 2014 he raced in a couple of races in the Lamborghini Super Trofeo and the ADAC Procar Series. In February 2015, it was announced that Grachev would make his TCR International Series debut with Liqui Moly Team Engstler.

Racing record

Complete European Touring Car Cup results
(key) (Races in bold indicate pole position) (Races in italics indicate fastest lap)

Complete TCR International Series results
(key) (Races in bold indicate pole position) (Races in italics indicate fastest lap)

† Driver did not finish the race, but was classified as he completed over 75% of the race distance.

References

External links
 

1988 births
Living people
European Touring Car Cup drivers
Russian racing drivers
TCR International Series drivers
Russian Circuit Racing Series drivers
Engstler Motorsport drivers